The PADC Hummingbird was a light utility helicopter that was developed by the Philippine Aerospace Development Corporation to reduce dependence on second-hand aircraft for the Philippine Air Force.

Design and development
During the 1980s the Philippine Air Force (PAF) attempted to reduce its dependence upon American second-hand aircraft by starting its own indigenous aircraft programs. The first program was a single-engine trainer plane, designated the PADC Defiant 300, that could also be armed and used in the counter-insurgency role. The second was a Philippine-made light utility helicopter named the "Hummingbird". The two aircraft programs were supported by members of the Armed Forces of the Philippines, but were not allowed to proceed by the government until July 1997, when President Fidel Ramos authorized spending for the project. The Philippine Aerospace Development Corporation (PADC) undertook the development effort.

Ramos was succeeded shortly thereafter by President Joseph Estrada, whose government immediately conducted a review of the Defiant and Hummingbird programs. The review concluded that the two projects, which were only a year old at that point, were likely to be unjustifiably lengthy and expensive. As a result, both were immediately terminated. Another factor was that the Hummingbird was in fact essentially an unlicensed copy of the MBB/Eurocopter Bo 105C and Eurocopter had threatened to sue the Philippine government. PADC had been involved with the assembly and maintenance on the helicopters, first acquired during the 1970s. To avoid the impending legal battle, the PAF cancelled the program. As of 2012, no attempt had been made to revive the Defiant or develop another helicopter program.

Variants
X-100AOne prototype converted from an MBB/Eurocopter Bo 105C.

Operators

 Philippine Air Force

Surviving aircraft
 The sole prototype is stored at Ninoy Aquino International Airport.

See also

References

Aircraft manufactured in the Philippines